The following outline is provided as an overview of and topical guide to Botswana:

Botswana – a landlocked sovereign country located in Southern Africa. Citizens of Botswana are Batswana (singular: Motswana), regardless of ethnicity. Formerly the British protectorate of Bechuanaland, Botswana adopted its new name after becoming independent within the Commonwealth on 30 September 1966. It is bordered by South Africa to the south and southeast, Namibia to the west, Zambia to the north, and Zimbabwe to the northeast. The economy, closely tied to South Africa's, is dominated by mining (especially diamonds), tourism, and cattle.

General reference

 Pronunciation: , also 
 Common English country name:  Botswana
 Official English country name:  The Republic of Botswana
 Official endonym:  Lefatshe la Botswana
 Adjectival: Motswana
 Demonym: Batswana
 Etymology: Land of the Tswana
 International rankings of Botswana
 ISO country codes: BW, BWA, 072
 ISO region codes: See ISO 3166-2:BW
 Internet country code top-level domain: .bw

Geography of Botswana

Geography of Botswana
 Botswana is: a landlocked country
 Location:
 Eastern Hemisphere and Southern Hemisphere
 Africa
 Southern Africa
 Time zone:  Central Africa Time (UTC+02)
 Extreme points of Botswana
 High:  Otse Hill 
 Low:  Confluence of Limpopo River and Shashe River 
 Land boundaries:  4,013 km
 1,840 km
 1,360 km
 813 km
 <1 km
 Coastline:  none
 Population of Botswana: 1,639,833 (2006) – 147th most populous country

 Area of Botswana:  – 46th largest country
 Atlas of Botswana

Environment of Botswana

 Climate of Botswana
 Ecoregions in Botswana
 Geology of Botswana
 Protected areas of Botswana
 National parks of Botswana
 Wildlife of Botswana
 Fauna of Botswana
 Birds of Botswana
 Mammals of Botswana

Natural geographic features of Botswana
 Glaciers in Botswana: none
 Lakes of Botswana
 Dams and reservoirs of Botswana
 Rivers of Botswana
 World Heritage Sites in Botswana: Tsodilo Hills and Okavango Delta

Regions of Botswana

Regions of Botswana

Ecoregions of Botswana

List of ecoregions in Botswana

Administrative divisions of Botswana

Administrative divisions of Botswana
 Districts of Botswana
 Sub-districts of Botswana

Districts of Botswana

Districts of Botswana

Sub-districts of Botswana

Municipalities of Botswana
 Capital of Botswana: Gaborone
 Cities of Botswana

Demography of Botswana

Demographics of Botswana

Government and politics of Botswana

 Form of government: parliamentary representative democratic republic
 Capital of Botswana: Gaborone
 Elections in Botswana
 Political parties in Botswana

Branches of government

Government of Botswana

Executive branch of the government of Botswana
 Head of state: President of Botswana
 Head of government: President of Botswana
 Cabinet of Botswana
 President
 Vice president
 Minister of Presidential Affairs and Public Administration
 Minister of Local Government
 Minister of Trade and Industry
 Minister of Finance and Development Planning
 Minister of Youth, Sports and Culture
 Minister of Minerals, Energy and Water Resources
 Minister of Infrastructure, Science and Technology
 Minister of Defence, Justice and Security
 Minister of Agriculture
 Minister of Works and Transport
 Minister of Labour and Home Affairs
 Minister of Health
 Minister of Foreign Affairs and International Cooperation (MoFAIC)
 Minister of Environment, Wildlife and Tourism
 Minister of Education and Skills Development
 Minister of Lands and Housing

Legislative branch of the government of Botswana
 Parliament of Botswana (bicameral)
 Upper house: Ntlo ya Dikgosi
 Lower house: National Assembly of Botswana
 Parliamentary constituencies of Botswana

Judicial branch of the government of Botswana

Court system of Botswana

Foreign relations of Botswana

Foreign relations of Botswana
 Diplomatic missions in Botswana
 Diplomatic missions of Botswana

International organization membership
The Republic of Botswana is a member of:

 African, Caribbean, and Pacific Group of States (ACP)
 African Development Bank Group (AfDB)
 African Union (AU)
 Commonwealth of Nations
 Food and Agriculture Organization (FAO)
 Group of 77 (G77)
 International Atomic Energy Agency (IAEA)
 International Bank for Reconstruction and Development (IBRD)
 International Civil Aviation Organization (ICAO)
 International Criminal Court (ICCt)
 International Criminal Police Organization (Interpol)
 International Development Association (IDA)
 International Federation of Red Cross and Red Crescent Societies (IFRCS)
 International Finance Corporation (IFC)
 International Fund for Agricultural Development (IFAD)
 International Labour Organization (ILO)
 International Monetary Fund (IMF)
 International Olympic Committee (IOC)
 International Organization for Standardization (ISO)
 International Red Cross and Red Crescent Movement (ICRM)
 International Telecommunication Union (ITU)

 International Telecommunications Satellite Organization (ITSO)
 International Trade Union Confederation (ITUC)
 Inter-Parliamentary Union (IPU)
 Multilateral Investment Guarantee Agency (MIGA)
 Nonaligned Movement (NAM)
 Organisation for the Prohibition of Chemical Weapons (OPCW)
 Southern African Customs Union (SACU)
 Southern African Development Community (SADC)
 United Nations (UN)
 United Nations Conference on Trade and Development (UNCTAD)
 United Nations Educational, Scientific, and Cultural Organization (UNESCO)
 United Nations Industrial Development Organization (UNIDO)
 United Nations Mission in the Sudan (UNMIS)
 Universal Postal Union (UPU)
 World Customs Organization (WCO)
 World Federation of Trade Unions (WFTU)
 World Health Organization (WHO)
 World Intellectual Property Organization (WIPO)
 World Meteorological Organization (WMO)
 World Tourism Organization (UNWTO)
 World Trade Organization (WTO)

Law and order in Botswana

Law of Botswana
 Constitution of Botswana
 Human rights in Botswana
 LGBT rights in Botswana
 Freedom of religion in Botswana
 Law Enforcement in Botswana

Military of Botswana

Military of Botswana
 Command
 Commander-in-chief:
 Forces
 Army of Botswana
 Navy of Botswana: None
 Air Force of Botswana

Local government in Botswana

Local government in Botswana

History of Botswana

History of Botswana

 History of Gaborone

Culture of Botswana

Culture of Botswana
 Cuisine of Botswana
 Languages of Botswana
 National symbols of Botswana
 Coat of arms of Botswana
 Flag of Botswana
 National anthem of Botswana
 People of Botswana
 Prostitution in Botswana
 Public holidays in Botswana
 Religion in Botswana
 Christianity in Botswana
 Hinduism in Botswana
 Islam in Botswana
 Sikhism in Botswana
 World Heritage Sites in Botswana:
 Okavango Delta
 Tsodilo

Art in Botswana
 Art in Botswana
 Music of Botswana

Sports in Botswana

Sports in Botswana
 Football in Botswana
 Botswana at the Olympics

Economy and infrastructure of Botswana

 Economic rank, by nominal GDP (2007): 106th (one hundred and sixth)
 Agriculture in Botswana
 Communications in Botswana
 Internet in Botswana
 Companies of Botswana
 Currency of Botswana: Pula
 ISO 4217: BWP
 Energy in Botswana
 Health care in Botswana
 Mining in Botswana
 Botswana Stock Exchange
 Tourism in Botswana
 Transport in Botswana
 Airports in Botswana
 Rail transport in Botswana
 Buildings in Botswana
 iTowers of Masa Square CBD

Education in Botswana

Education in Botswana

Health in Botswana

Health in Botswana

See also

Botswana
 
 
 List of Botswana-related topics
 List of international rankings
 Member state of the Commonwealth of Nations
 Member state of the United Nations
 Outline of Africa
 Outline of geography

References

External links

 
 The Government of Botswana
 
 Botswana. The World Factbook. Central Intelligence Agency.
 WWW-VL: Botswana History

Botswana
Botswana
 Outline